Julien Macdonald OBE (born 19 March 1971) is a Welsh fashion designer who has appeared as judge on the television programme, Britain & Ireland's Next Top Model. In 2001, he was named "British Fashion Designer of the Year", and on 15 March 2001, was appointed as chief designer at Givenchy (Alexander McQueen's successor). His atelier is at Old Burlington Street, London.

Early life 
Julien Macdonald was born in Merthyr Tydfil, Wales, where he attended Cyfarthfa High School. When Julien finished High School he studied Art at The College Merthyr Tydfil, where he developed his design skills with lecturer Martyn Jones. He was taught knitting by his mother and soon became interested in design.

Julien Macdonald was also interested in a career as a dancer, but, instead, studied textiles at the Faculty of Arts and Architecture, Brighton. He then became a student at the Royal College of Art, where he gained a master's degree.

Career
Soon after graduation, Julien Macdonald was recruited by Karl Lagerfeld to work for Chanel, a role that was accompanied with creating knitwear for Alexander McQueen.

In 2001, Julien Macdonald was appointed to the position of chief designer at the Paris Haute Couture house of Givenchy (as successor to Alexander McQueen); and, in 2001, he was named British Fashion Designer of the Year. He forms part of the media profile given to Welsh figures in the Cool Cymru movement.

He was selected by British Airways in 2001 to redesign their flight attendants' uniforms.

In 2014, Julien Macdonald launched an eyewear range in collaboration with Vision Express.

Controversy
Julien Macdonald attracted much criticism for his extensive use of fur, including one incident in which he and Paris Hilton were flour-bombed. He stated that fur provides the majority of his revenue and that his label would collapse were he not to use it.

In 2017, Julien MacDonald apologized for his previous use of fur, telling Reuters, "You do not need to kill animals to wear nice clothes."

Celebrity clients
Macdonald's dresses have been worn by celebrities including Kylie Minogue, Beyoncé and Jennifer Lopez. In 2009 MacDonald was the chief designer for the costumes of Pop group Girls Aloud during their Out of Control Tour.

Media appearances
Macdonald appeared as a judge on the British version of Project Runway, known as Project Catwalk, that was broadcast on Sky One.

In February 2010, Macdonald was appointed as a new judge on Britain's Next Top Model, alongside new host and former supermodel, Elle Macpherson.

In September 2013, MacDonald was revealed as one of the contestants on the dancing competition television show Strictly Come Dancing. Janette Manrara is his professional partner and the designer explained in a 17 September interview: "she’s [Manrara] the one that literally keeps me on my toes ... after only two weeks of training, parts of me hurt that I didn't even know existed." The couple were eliminated in the fourth week of the competition after losing to Countdown presenter Rachel Riley.

Awards
In June 2006, MacDonald was awarded an OBE in the Queen's Birthday Honours for services to fashion.

In May 2016, MacDonald was awarded the GENLUX/BRITWEEK Designer of the Year Award.

References

External links
 The Julien Macdonald Website

 UKTV Style video – backstage at a Julien MacDonald fashion show

1971 births
Living people
Cool Cymru
People from Dunblane
Welsh fashion designers
British fashion designers
Welsh people of Scottish descent
Alumni of the University of Brighton
Alumni of the Royal College of Art
Officers of the Order of the British Empire